Olle Eriksson  (March 19, 1925 – March 14, 1983) was a Swedish politician. He was a member of the Centre Party, member of the Parliament of Sweden (lower chamber) from 1970, and of the unicameral parliament from 1971.

References

Members of the Riksdag from the Centre Party (Sweden)
1925 births
1983 deaths
20th-century Swedish politicians